Shelter is a 2012 American film directed, produced, and written by Adam Caudill and Wrion Bowling. It was shot as a passion project for under $100,000. It has been featured at a number of festivals including the 2013 Eerie Horror Film Festival where it won Best Director, and the 2012 Williamsburg Independent Film Festival where it won Best Narrative Feature Film.

Plot 
An ominous disaster forces five survivors to wait out nuclear winter in a secret underground bomb shelter. With limited supplies and nowhere else to go, they struggle against the clock, uncertain if they'll survive until it's safe to return to the surface. As weeks turn into months, one room proves too small for five people. Habits curdle into routine, relationships dissolve, obsessions give way to madness.

Cast 
 Joyce Hshieh as Chelsea
 Michael Lane as Hudson
 Sarah Street as Marisa
 Jeffrey Green as Jeff
 Carlos Garcia as Tyler

Production 
Shot as a passion project for under $100,000 in Akron, Ohio writing and directing team of Adam Caudill and Wrion Bowling assembled a talented cast and crew to create their film.

Reception 
The reception has been generally positive. The film has been featured at a number of festivals including the 2013 Eerie Horror Film Festival where it won Best Director, and the 2012 Williamsburg Independent Film Festival where it won Best Narrative Feature Film.

References

External links
 

2010s thriller films
2012 horror films
2012 films
American horror films
2010s English-language films
2010s American films
Films set in bunkers